Frode Moen (born 1 May 1969) is a retired Norwegian Nordic combined skier.

Representing the sports club Byåsen IL, he competed in the Nordic Combined World Cup. In the 1990–91 season he placed ninth overall, and seventh overall in 1991–92.

References

1969 births
Living people
Sportspeople from Trondheim
Norwegian male Nordic combined skiers
Place of birth missing (living people)
20th-century Norwegian people